Kham Khrang is a tambon (subdistrict) of Det Udom District, in Ubon Ratchathani Province, Thailand. In 2021, it had a population of 6,731 people. Neighbouring subdistricts are (clockwise from the south) Bua Ngam, Klang, Phon Ngam, Kut Prathai, and Na Pho.

History
Kham Khrang legally gained village status in 1935 with Aon Boonma as the first village headman. It was first administered from Kut Prathai and later became a subdistrict in its own right in 1980.

Administration
The tambon is divided into eight administrative villages (mubans; หมู่บ้าน) which are further divided into ten community groups (Mu; หมู่). All of which were governed by the Subdistrict Administrative Organization of Kham Khrang (องค์การบริหารส่วนตำบลคำครั่ง).

The following is a list of the subdistrict's mubans, which roughly correspond to the villages:

Headman
The following is a list of the subdistrict's headman (Kamnan) since its establishment in 1980.

References

Tambon of Ubon Ratchathani Province